Hannah Smith may refer to:

 Hannah Smith (philanthropist) (1897–1960), American philanthropist and arts patron
 Hannah Smith (bowls) (born 1987), Welsh bowler
 Hannah Smith (rugby union) (born 1992), Scottish rugby player
 Hannah Clayson Smith, American lawyer 
 Hannah Whitall Smith (1832–1911), American writer and activist